Indiosina is a genus of flies belonging to the family Lesser Dung flies.

Species
I. loebli Papp, 1981

References

Sphaeroceridae
Diptera of Asia
Brachycera genera